This is a list of current and former Roman Catholic churches in the Roman Catholic Diocese of Des Moines. The diocese includes more than 80 churches located throughout southwestern Iowa. The cathedral church of the diocese is St. Ambrose Cathedral in Des Moines.

Des Moines Region

Adair Region

Council Bluffs Region

Osceola Region

Portsmouth Region

Red Oak Region

References

 
Des Moines